Heggmovatnet is a lake that lies in the municipality of Bodø in Nordland county, Norway. The lake is regulated and it is the main water source for the town of Bodø. The water flows out of the lake into the river Heggmoelva, which then flows into the lake Vatnvatnet. Sjunkhatten National Park surrounds the lake.

See also
 List of lakes in Norway
 Geography of Norway

References

Lakes of Nordland
Bodø